Christian Hartmann (3 June 1910 – 29 May 1985) was a Norwegian composer, born in Asker.

Hartmann composed melodies to a number of songs, including Prøysen's "Musevisa", "Romjulsdrøm" and "Æille har et syskjenbån på Gjøvik", and Skjæraasen's "Høstvise" and "Åtte øyne i hverandre". His cooperation with Thorbjørn Egner resulted in music to songs from Karius and Bactus, Doktor Dyregod and Dyrene i Hakkebakkeskogen .

Film music includes compositions for Finn Bø and Titus Vibe-Müller's  1946 film To liv and Per Høst's  1957 film Same-Jakki.

Hartmann was the brother of the journalist and screenwriter Alf Hartmann.

References

1910 births
1985 deaths
Musicians from Asker
Norwegian composers
Norwegian male composers
20th-century composers
20th-century Norwegian male musicians